is a Japanese family-owned property management firm. As of 2015 its president and CEO is Shingo Tsuji. Its headquarters are in the Roppongi Hills Mori Tower in Roppongi, Minato, Tokyo.

Mori Building has been managing office building leases since 1955. Its focus has been in Minato, Tokyo.

Taikichiro Mori, the founder, quit his job as an economics professor and entered the real estate business. He became the richest man in the world, and his net worth in 1992 was $13 billion U.S. dollars. At the time his net worth was double that of Bill Gates and $3 billion more than Yoshiaki Tsutsumi. Taikichiro Mori died of heart failure on January 30, 1993, at the age of 88.

Projects

Completed
Ark Hills (1986)
Atago Green Hills (2001)
Roppongi Hills (2003)
Holland Hills (2005)
Omotesando Hills (2006)
Shanghai World Financial Center (2008)
Ark Hills Sengokuyama Mori Tower (2012)
Toranomon Hills (2014)
Jakarta Mori Tower (2022)

Under construction
Azabudai Hills

See also

 Minoru Mori

References

External links
Mori Building Company 
Mori Building Company

 
Real estate companies established in 1959
Real estate companies based in Tokyo
1959 establishments in Japan